Rives Township is a civil township of Jackson County in the U.S. state of Michigan. The population was 4,683 at the 2010 census.

Communities 
It was founded in 1834 by Samuel Prescott and Henry Fifield. A post office named "West Rives" was established on June 15, 1839, with Prescott as the first postmaster, operating from his home on the west side of the Michigan Central Railroad tracks. The community developed on the eastern side of the tracks and was renamed "Eaton Rapids Junction" on March 12, 1866, and again renamed "Rives Junction" on May 7, 1866. The Rives Junction post office, with ZIP Code 49277, continues to serve large portions of Rives Township as well as northeast portions of adjacent Tompkins Township. Rives Junction was the junction between the Michigan Central lines to Saginaw and Grand Rapids.

Geography

Rives Township is in northern Jackson County, bordered to the north by Ingham County. U.S. Route 127 crosses the center of the township, leading north  to Lansing and south  to Jackson.  The township is drained by the Grand River, which crosses from the southern border to the northwest corner.

A portion of Meridian-Baseline State Park is located within Rives Township.

Demographics
As of the census of 2000, there were 4,725 people, 1,677 households, and 1,319 families residing in the township. The racial makeup of the township was 97.14% White, 0.19% African American, 0.61% Native American, 0.11% Asian, 0.06% Pacific Islander, 0.51% from other races, and 1.38% from two or more races. Hispanic or Latino of any race were 1.76% of the population.

There were 1,677 households, out of which 38.2% had children under the age of 18 living with them, 65.1% were married couples living together, 10.6% had a female householder with no husband present, and 21.3% were non-families. 16.2% of all households were made up of individuals, and 5.6% had someone living alone who was 65 years of age or older.  The average household size was 2.80 and the average family size was 3.13.

In the township the population was spread out, with 28.6% under the age of 18, 6.9% from 18 to 24, 30.0% from 25 to 44, 25.2% from 45 to 64, and 9.4% who were 65 years of age or older.  The median age was 36 years. For every 100 females, there were 97.3 males.  For every 100 females age 18 and over, there were 92.5 males.

The median income for a household in the township was $53,819, and the median income for a family was $58,897. Males had a median income of $42,131 versus $27,743 for females. The per capita income for the township was $22,942.  About 6.3% of families and 8.6% of the population were below the poverty line, including 16.4% of those under age 18 and 1.8% of those age 65 or over.

References

External links
Rives Township official website

Townships in Jackson County, Michigan
Townships in Michigan
Populated places established in 1837
1837 establishments in Michigan